The Rural Strategic Investment Program is an investment program established by the 2002 farm bill (P.L. 107-171, Sec. 6030) to fund regional investment boards. The Strategic Investment Program provides grants totaling up to $100 million for rural regional planning and plan implementation. Eligible communities are non-metropolitan counties with a population of 50,000 or less. Certain exceptions to the population threshold are allowed if the community is immediately adjacent to an eligible area. (7 U.S.C. 2009dd).

References 

Farm Security and Rural Investment Act of 2002